An indiscrete category is a category C in which every hom-set C(X, Y) is a singleton. Every class X gives rise to an indiscrete category whose objects are the elements of X such that for any two objects A and B, there is only one morphism from A to B. Any two nonempty indiscrete categories are equivalent to each other. The functor from Set to Cat that sends a set to the corresponding indiscrete category is right adjoint to the functor that sends a small category to its set of objects.

References

Category theory